Madison is a village in Madison County, New York, United States. The population was 305 at the 2010 census. The village and its town are named after President James Madison.

The Village of Madison is in the central part of the Town of Madison on US Route 20.

History 

The village was incorporated in 1816. Located on NY Route 20, Madison was a busy thoroughfare for east-west travelers and featured a hotel and resort on Madison Lake. Much of Madison was owned by businessman G.W. Hinman. Many visitors came from the nearby hamlet of Solsville, where the Chenengo Canal and the railroad both had stations. Madison is most famous for the Madison-Bouckville Antique Show, which takes place in August annually and sees over 1,000 antique dealers and tens of thousands of buyers traveling to Madison to find rare and unique items.

In 2000, Solsville, a half-mile north of Madison, became part of the town of Madison. Solsville is known for its historic Solsville Hotel, which was at one point the town post office, saloon, and ballroom, and is currently home to a restaurant and Irish popular pub, owned by B. Dixon. The old canal house in Solsville has also been converted into a bar.

Notable person
Phineas L. Tracy, former US Congressman

Geography
Madison is located at  (42.900775, -75.515153).

According to the United States Census Bureau, the village has a total area of 0.5 square mile (1.3 km2), all land.

Demographics

As of the census of 2000, there were 315 people, 138 households, and 77 families residing in the village. The population density was 626.5 people per square mile (243.2/km2). There were 151 housing units at an average density of 300.3 per square mile (116.6/km2). The racial makeup of the village was 99.68% White and 0.32% Asian. Hispanic or Latino of any race were 0.63% of the population.

There were 138 households, out of which 26.1% had children under the age of 18 living with them, 44.2% were married couples living together, 9.4% had a female householder with no husband present, and 43.5% were non-families. 36.2% of all households were made up of individuals, and 14.5% had someone living alone who was 65 years of age or older. The average household size was 2.28 and the average family size was 3.01.

In the village, the population was spread out, with 24.4% under the age of 18, 7.0% from 18 to 24, 29.2% from 25 to 44, 23.2% from 45 to 64, and 16.2% who were 65 years of age or older. The median age was 38 years. For every 100 females, there were 87.5 males. For every 100 females age 18 and over, there were 83.1 males.

The median income for a household in the village was $27,250, and the median income for a family was $37,708. Males had a median income of $28,125 versus $21,786 for females. The per capita income for the village was $16,960. About 9.9% of families and 12.9% of the population were below the poverty line, including 7.6% of those under age 18 and 3.7% of those age 65 or over.

References

Villages in New York (state)
Syracuse metropolitan area
Populated places established in 1816
Villages in Madison County, New York
1816 establishments in New York (state)